In superconductivity, the superconducting coherence length, usually denoted as  (Greek lowercase xi), is the characteristic exponent of the variations of the density of superconducting component.

The superconducting coherence length is one of two parameters in the Ginzburg–Landau theory of superconductivity. It is given by:

In Landau mean-field theory, at temperatures  near the superconducting critical temperature , .

In some special limiting cases, for example in the  weak-coupling BCS theory of isotropic s-wave superconductor it is related to characteristic Cooper pair size:

The superconducting coherence length is a measure of the size of a Cooper pair (distance between the two electrons) and is of the order of  cm. The electron near or at the Fermi surface moving through the lattice of a metal produces behind itself an attractive potential of range of the order of  cm, the lattice distance being of order  cm. For a very authoritative explanation based on physical intuition see the CERN article by V.F. Weisskopf.

The ratio , where  is the London penetration depth, is known as the Ginzburg–Landau parameter.

In strong-coupling, anisotropic and multi-component theories these expressions are modified.

See also
  Ginzburg–Landau theory of superconductivity
  BCS theory of superconductivity
  London penetration depth

References

Superconductivity